You'll Never Tame Me is the third full-length studio album released by American punk rock musician GG Allin, recorded with his backing band the Scumfucs. Like Eat My Fuc before it, the lyrics continued to contain shock value, although Allin's singing voice, for the most part, had yet to deteriorate to a husky growl.

Included on the album are two rewrites of Hank Williams Jr. songs, "Women I've Never Had" and "Family Tradition". Allin retitled his own versions "Fuck Women I've Never Had" and "Scumfuc Tradition" respectively.

Originally released in cassette in 1985, the album was reissued in CD format by Black & Blue Records in 1999.

Track listing

 "Fuck Women I've Never Had" – 1:35
 "I Want to Fuck Myself" – 2:52
 "Needle Up My Cock" – 3:14
 "Assfuckin, Butt Suckin, Cunt Lickin, Masturbation" – 3:04
 "You'll Never Tame Me" – 2:44
 "Torture You" – 3:10
 "Bite It You Scum" – 3:50
 "Scumfuc Tradition" – 2:08
 "I Fuck the Dead" – 4:32
 "I Wanna Die" – 3:55
 "Kill the Children, Save the Food" – 2:43
 "I Wanna Piss on You" – 2:15

References

External links
GG Allin discography

1985 albums
Black & Blue Records albums
GG Allin albums